The Marriage was a short-lived (1953–54) radio series which starred Hume Cronyn and Jessica Tandy. Based on their earlier Broadway play, The Fourposter, the series aired Sunday evenings on NBC at 7:30 p.m. Eastern Time from October 4, 1953 through March 28, 1954. The scripts were mostly written by Ernest Kinoy, and the closing theme was "A Star Is Born", by Robert Farnon.

Characters and story
New York attorney Ben Marriott (Hume Cronyn) was married to former department store fashion buyer Liz (Jessica Tandy), who struggled with her switch to domestic life. The sophisticated couple discussed such subjects as art, theater, literature and philosophy, while raising a son, Pete, and an awkward teenage daughter, Emily (Denise Alexander).

Written by Ernest Kinoy, the series had an unusual gimmick of alternating viewpoints, as Ben narrated one week and Liz the next.

Television
The show was scheduled to move from radio to television, with Cronyn producing as well as acting in the show. However, Tandy suffered a miscarriage, and the show's debut was delayed a week. The TV series of the same name premiered in July 1954 to "warm and enthusiastic reviews." It ran through August, and abruptly ended after eight episodes.

References

External links

1950s American radio programs
1953 radio programme debuts
1954 radio programme endings
American comedy radio programs
NBC radio programs